Dear Parents is a 1973 Italian drama film directed by Enrico Maria Salerno. For this film Florinda Bolkan was awarded with a David di Donatello for Best Actress.

Cast 
Florinda Bolkan: Giulia Bonanni
Catherine Spaak: Madeleine
Maria Schneider: Antonia
Tom Baker: Karl
 Malcolm Stoddard: Joe
 Jean Anderson: Mrs. Ward
 Spencer Banks

References

External links

1973 films
1973 drama films
Films directed by Enrico Maria Salerno
Italian drama films
1970s Italian-language films
1970s Italian films